Om Prakash Mitharwal (born 15 August 1995) is an Indian sport shooter. At the 2018 ISSF World Shooting Championships, he won the gold medal in the 50 metre pistol and silver in 10 metre air pistol team event. He won the gold medal at the 2018 ISSF World Cup in Guadalajara in the 10 metre air pistol mixed team event with Manu Bhaker.

He won bronze in the 10 metre air pistol and 50 metre pistol events at the 2018 Commonwealth Games in Gold Coast.

References

External links
 
 

Living people
1995 births
Indian male sport shooters
Sport shooters from Rajasthan
Shooters at the 2018 Commonwealth Games
Commonwealth Games medallists in shooting
Commonwealth Games bronze medallists for India
ISSF pistol shooters
21st-century Indian people
Recipients of the Arjuna Award
Medallists at the 2018 Commonwealth Games